The UNESCO (United Nations Educational, Scientific and Cultural Organization) World Heritage Sites are places of importance to cultural or natural heritage as described in the UNESCO World Heritage Convention, established in 1972. Tanzania ratified the convention on 2 August 1977, making its historical sites eligible for inclusion on the list. Tanzania has seven UNESCO World Heritage Sites and two of them are placed on the World Heritage Sites in danger.

List of sites 
The table lists information about each World Heritage Site:

 Name: as listed by the World Heritage Committee
 Location: province or town of site
 Period: time period of significance
 UNESCO data: the site's reference number; the year the site was inscribed on the World Heritage List; the criteria it was listed under. Criteria i through vi are cultural, while vii through x are natural (the column sorts by year added to the list)
 Description: brief description of the site
 

In addition to the seven official sites, Tanzania maintains a tentative list of five more sites, provided by Tanzania's state party.

• Oldonyo Murwak

• Gombe National Park

• Jozani-Chwaka Bay Conservation Area

• Eastern Arc Mountain Forests of Tanzania

• The Central Slave Trade and Ivory Route (trans-national site, includes Bagamoyo, Mamboya, Mpwapwa, Kilimatinde, Kwihara and Ujiji Bagamoyo)

See also

Tourism in Tanzania
List of World Heritage in Danger

References

External links 

Tanzania
 List
World Heritage Sites